Dr. Stefan Frank – Der Arzt, dem die Frauen vertrauen is a German medical television series produced from 1995 to 2001 on behalf of RTL. This TV series was adapted from the cycle of the same title published by Bastei and it was also broadcast outside Germany in Switzerland, Austria, Belgium and Croatia. The theme song is Alles, was du willst (Everything you want) by Roland Kaiser.

Plot 

The series deals with the physician Dr. Stefan Frank (played by ) who lives with his father Dr. Eberhard Frank (Hans Caninenberg), his housekeeper Martha Brunnacker, the housekeeper's brother Louis Brunnacker and his receptionist Marie-Luise Flanitzer near his practice in the district of Bogenhausen in Munich. Dr. Stefan Frank is a surgeon and gynaecologist. He works together with the chief physician Dr. Ulrich Waldner (Hartmut Becker) and the head of the clinic Irene Kaldenbach in the Waldner-Klinik. Over all seasons and despite changing relationships he has maintained a close relationship to the practice doctor Dr. Susanne Berger who he later has a child with.

Broadcast 

The initial broadcast of the series was the pilot film Ein Ende kann ein neuer Anfang sein (An end can be a new beginning) aired on 2 March 1995 on the private station RTL. The first season was broadcast until July 1995. Broadcast date was Thursday evening at 20:15 h which was retained for the transmission of four further seasons. Season 2 was broadcast from February to June 1996, season 3 from July 1997 to January 1998. Seasons four and five were broadcast from March 1999 to Mai 2000, the time lag between these two seasons was just three months.

When the sixth and last season had been broadcast since 13 June 2001, it was the first time that the broadcast date changed; the series now was aired on Wednesday evening at 21:15 h. After 104   episodes the last episode Bei aller Liebe (For the love of god) was broadcast on 5 September.

See also
List of German television series

External links 

 
 Informationen bei DrStefanFrank.de
 Informationen bei fernsehserien.de
 Informationen bei wunschliste.de
 Episodenführer

References

RTL (German TV channel) original programming
German drama television series
German medical television series
1995 German television series debuts
2001 German television series endings
Television shows based on German novels
German-language television shows